Song Shilun (1907–1991), né Song Jirao (宋际尧, named from Chinese legendary King Yao), alternative name Song Zhiguang (宋之光), born September 10, 1907 in Liling, Hunan Province, was a general of the People's Liberation Army of the People's Republic of China. General Song had graduated from Whampoa Military Academy and participated in the Long March, Anti-Japanese war, Chinese civil war and Korea war, respectively. He died September 17, 1991 in Shanghai.

Korean War
During the Korean War, General Song Shilun commanded the People's Volunteer Army 9th Army. His armies fought against the US Army 31st Regimental Combat Team and the 1st Marine Division at the Chosin Reservoir in November–December 1950.

Reaction to the government's response to the Tiananmen Square protests
During the Tiananmen Square protests of spring 1989, Song Shilun joined former Minister of Defense Zhang Aiping and five other retired generals in opposing the enforcement of martial law by the Army in Beijing.

Notes

1907 births
1991 deaths
People's Liberation Army generals from Hunan
Politicians from Zhuzhou
Chinese Communist Party politicians from Hunan
People's Republic of China politicians from Hunan